Hu Zhijun (born July 24, 1970) is a retired Chinese football player. He won the first Golden Boot Award of Chinese professional football league after scoring 17 goals in the 1994 Chinese Jia-A League.

Club career
Hu Zhijun played for Guangzhou Apollo, Guangzhou Songri, Shanghai Shenhua and Shanghai Cosco throughout his professional career. He scored seventeen goals in the Chinese Jia-A League 1994, which made him the first golden boot awardee of Chinese professional football league.

International goals
Results list China's goal tally first.

Honours

club
Guangzhou Apollo
Chinese Jia-A League Runner-up (1): 1994
Chinese Football Association Golden Boot awardee(1): 1994

Shanghai Shenhua
Chinese Jia-A League Runner-up (1): 2000

Shanghai Cosco
Chinese Jia-B League champions (1): 2001

International
China national football team
Asian Games Runner-up (1): 1994

References

External links

Living people
1970 births
Chinese footballers
Guangzhou F.C. players
Shanghai Shenhua F.C. players
China international footballers
Footballers from Guangzhou
Asian Games silver medalists for China
Medalists at the 1994 Asian Games
Asian Games medalists in football
Association football forwards
Footballers at the 1994 Asian Games